is a town located in Iburi Subprefecture, Hokkaido, Japan. As of 30 September 2016, the town has an estimated population of 8,323.

Geography
Located in the north-east of Iburi Subprefecture, and is a hilly area extending from the Yufutsu Plain to the Yūbari Mountains and the Maoi Hills. Abira is surrounded by Tomakomai in the south-west, Chitose in the north-west, Yuni in from the north to the east, and Atsuma in the south-east. The Toasa River flows through Abira and Tomakomai, and Abira River flows through the center of Abira.

The Pacific Ocean is close to the southern areas of Abira. So those areas' weather is mild year-round because of the oceanic climate. The northern areas have an inland climate, so the temperatures are high in the summer and a harsh cold in the winter. All together, the yearly snowfall is low.

 Mountains: Kumanoatama Yama (155m), Shiabiranupuri (364m)
 Rivers: Abira River
 Bodies of water: Mizuho Reservoir

Neighboring municipalities
 Iburi Subprefecture: Tomakomai, Atsuma
 Ishikari Subprefecture: Chitose
 Sorachi Subprefecture: Yuni

Origin of the town's name
The name "Abira" comes from the Ainu language. However, there are various opinions as to what Ainu words does it come from. 
Possible words include: 
 "ar-pira-pet" (pronounced arapirape in Japanese) [meaning the surface of a cliff's river]
 "ar-pira" (pronounced arapira in Japanese) [one side of a cliff]

History

 1900 (33rd year of the Meiji Era): Abira's own government office is established.
 1902 (Meiji 35): Shika Park is opened.
 1908 (Meiji 41): The village of Abira received a 2nd grade town/village rating from the Japanese government.
 1923 (12th year of the Taishō Era): Abira received a 1st grade town/village rating.
 1952 (27th year of the Shōwa Era): The village of Oiwake separated from the village of Abira.
 1953 (Shōwa 28): The village of Oiwake became a town.
 1954 (Shōwa 29): The village of Abira changed its name to Hayakita.
 1957 (Shōwa 32): The village of Hayakita became a town.
 1994 (6th year of the Heisei Era): Northern Farm, a horse-breeding ranch, was opened.
 2006 (Heisei 18): The towns of Hayakita and Oiwake merged and became the town of Abira.
 2018 (Heisei 30): The 2018 Hokkaido Eastern Iburi earthquake occurred. Abira experienced a JMA seismic intensity of 6 higher.。

Economy

Industry
Agriculture is the main industry for Abira. Abira's Toasa area is especially famous for its breeding of dairy cattle, which are then sent all over Japan. Another specialty is cantaloupe. Asahi Melon is a well known brand from the area.
 
Horse breeding is also a thriving industry in Abira, such as Yoshida Bokujo (Yoshida Ranch) in the Hayakita-Tomioka area and Northern Farm in the Hayakita-genbu area. The local horse breeding industry actively participates in the JRA Central Horse Racing. Many offsprings of famous stallions, such as Marzensky and 2005's Japanese Triple Crown of Thoroughbred Racing winner Deep Impact, are bred here.

 New Chitose Airport and Tomakomai's eastern industrial area are close to Abira, so it is also active in attracting industry.
 There are many golf courses.
 Since 1986, has been selling a Snowman Packaging through the Japan Post Service.

Local Companies
 The Hokkaido factory of Iris Ohyama
 SoftBank Tomatoh Abira Solar Park
 The Hayakita factory for Saveur Ss Inc (previously the Hokkaido factory for Snow Brand Foods).

Agricultural cooperative
 The Hayakita branch and Oiwake branch of the Tomakomai wide-area of the Japan Agricultural Cooperatives.

Post Offices
 Hayakita-Yukidaruma Post Office
 Oiwake Post Office
 Toasa Post Office
 Abira Post Office

Financial institutions
 Hokkaido Bank Hayakita Branch, Oiwake Branch
 Hokuo Credit Union Hayakita Branch
 Credit Federation of Agricultural Cooperatives AKA JA Hokkaido Shinren AKA Shinren, JA Tomakomai Area Hayakita Branch and Oiwake Branch.

Public institutions

Police Department
 Tomakomai Police's Hayakita Police Box

Fire Department
 East Iburi Firefighters Union – Abira Substation Fire Department
 Oiwake Branch Fire Department

Region

Population

Schools
 High Schools
 Oiwake High School (Established by Hokkaido Prefecture)
 Junior High Schools
 Oiwake Junior High School (Established by the town of Abira)
 Hayakita Junior High School (Established by the town of Abira)
 Elementary School
 Oiwake Elementary School (Established by the town of Abira)
 Hayakita Elementary School (Established by the town of Abira)
 Toasa Elementary School (Established by the town of Abira)
 Abira Elementary School (Established by the town of Abira)

Area broadcasting
Abira obtained a general terrestrial broadcast station license and now broadcasts Abira Channel in the local area.

Transportation

Airport
 New Chitose Airport (Chitose) is near.

Rail transport
 Hokkaido Railway Company (JR Hokkaido)
 Muroran Main Line: Toasa Station – Hayakita Station – Abira Station – Oiwake Station
 Sekishō Line: Oiwake Station – (Higashi-Oiwake Signal Station)

At one time, a company called Hayakita Railway (now known as Atsuma Bus) had a train line from Hayakita Station to Atsuma.

Bus
 Atsuma Bus
 Donan Bus

Taxi
 Hayakita Hire
 Oiwake Hire

Roads and highways
Controlled-access highway
 Dōtō Expressway: Oiwake Interchange
 National Highway
 National Route 234 
 Prefectural road
 Hokkaido Prefectural Road 10 Chitose Mukawa Route
 Hokkaido Prefectural Road 226 Maizuru Oiwake Route
 Hokkaido Prefectural Road 235 Kamihoronai Hayakita Depot Route
 Hokkaido Prefectural Road 258 Hayakita Chitose Route
 Hokkaido Prefectural Road 290 Oiwake Depot Route
 Hokkaido Prefectural Road 462 Kawabata Oiwake Route
 Hokkaido Prefectural Road 482 Togawa Toasa Depot Route
 Hokkaido Prefectural Road 576 Zuiho Abira Depot Route
 Hokkaido Prefectural Road 933 Hokushin Hiratori Route

Attractions

Designated Cultural Assets

Source: List of Designated Municipal Cultural Properties in Hokkaido
 Wooden Silo – At risk of collapse due to aging, its Cultural Asset designation was removed and it was torn down.
 Within the "Abira Roadside Station D51":
 JNR Class D51-320 steam locomotive – Railroad Museum
 JNR Class D51-241 steam locomotive number plate – Railroad Museum
 1890s railroad track rail – Railroad Museum
 Small fire truck from 1955 – Abira Fire Department Substation Oiwake Branch
 Manuel firefighting pump – Abira Fire Department Substation Oiwake Branch
 Fire alarm bell from 1915 – Abira Fire Department Substation Oiwake Branch
 2 stone storehouses
 The remains of the Yufutsu Electric Company
 Settlers Monument (Located at the place where Hayakita was founded) – Hayakitatomioka
 Location of the town's first rice paddy (monument) – Abira
 Settlers Monument – Hayakitamizuho
 Settlers Monument – Hayakitamidorioka
 Hayakita Junior High School Monument – Hayakitahokushin
 The resting place of renowned race horse Ten Point (Monument)
 Japan's first cheese factory (Monument)
 Irrigation Ditch Monument
 Myoshuhen Irrigation Ditch Monument
 Location of Abira's first school – 1893 (Meiji 26). Taught by town volunteers and based on the Terakoya system.
 Location of Abira's first school building
 Hokkaido Colliery and Railway Company's cokeyard (former coke factory)
 Former location of the Oiwake Rail yard
 First forest in Japan protected under the designation of health and safety forest. (Encompasses Abira's Shika Park)
 The location of Abira's first post office – 1896 (Meiji 29), was established near the current JP Oiwake branch post office.
 Large elm tree – owned by Oiwake Farm
 Site of the former Fuji Brewing Company

Sightseeing spots
 Abira Shika Park
 Seiko Dome – An athletics institute that was made to honor the activities of Seiko Hashimoto.
 Tsuru no Yu Onsen
 Railroad Museum – closed for winter from November to April
 Mizuho Dam

Famous people

 Kenryō Ashikaga – Professor of human geography at Kyoto University (1936–1999)
 Miman Endo – Painter (1913–2004)
 Masaru Onozuka – News Commentator for the Hokkaido Television Broadcasting Co. (b. 1945)
 Noriyuki Nakao – Former member of the House of Councillors and currently the president of Hokkaido Media Port (b. 1946)
 Seiko Hashimoto – Former speed skater and a current member of the House of Councillors (b. 1964 )
 Akira Matsuura – Politician (1929–1996)

References

External links

Official Website 

Towns in Hokkaido